Markku Takala (born May 2, 1972) is a Finnish former professional ice hockey centre.

Takala played in the SM-liiga for Kiekko-Espoo and Lukko. He also played in the British Ice Hockey Superleague for the Newcastle Cobras and the Elite Ice Hockey League for the Basingstoke Bison as well as in Norway for the Sparta Warriors and Furuset Ishockey.

References

External links

1972 births
Living people
Basingstoke Bison players
Brest Albatros Hockey players
Espoo Blues players
Finnish ice hockey centres
Furuset Ishockey players
Kiekko-Vantaa players
Kristianstads IK players
Lukko players
Newcastle Cobras players
Olofströms IK players
Sparta Warriors players
Sportspeople from Vantaa